The women's marathon swimming over a distance of 10 kilometres at the 2016 Summer Olympics in Rio de Janeiro took place on 15 August at Fort Copacabana.

Summary
Sharon van Rouwendaal of Netherlands won the gold medal, Rachele Bruni of Italy was runner-up, and Poliana Okimoto of Brazil finished third. The original silver medalist was Aurelie Muller of France, who managed to overcome Bruni in the last second of the race. However, a video replay showed Muller forcibly holding Bruni down with her right arm while trying to touch the finishing board, thus being disqualified from the race.

Qualification

The women's 10 km open water marathon at the 2016 Olympics featured a field of 26 swimmers:

10: the top-10 finishers in the 10 km races at the 2015 World Championships
9: the top-9 finishers at the 2016 Olympic Marathon Swim Qualifier (June 11–12, 2016 in Setúbal, Portugal)
5: one representative from each FINA continent (Africa, Americas, Asia, Europe and Oceania). (These have been selected based on the finishes at the qualifying race in Setúbal.)
1: from the host nation (Brazil) if not qualified by other means. If Brazil already contained a qualifier in the race, this spot had been allocated back into the general pool from the 2016 Olympic qualifier race.

Competition format

Unlike all of the other swimming events in the pool, the men's and women's marathon 10 kilometre races are held in open water. No preliminary heats are held, with only the single mass-start race being contested. This race is held using freestyle swimming, with a lack of stroke regulations.

Results

References

Women's 10000 metre marathon
Olympics
2016 in women's swimming
Women's events at the 2016 Summer Olympics